The Amelia Earhart Birthplace is a historic building and museum that was the birthplace of aviator Amelia Earhart. It is located at 223 N. Terrace in Atchison, Kansas, United States.

The house was built in 1861 in a Gothic Revival style and is on a bluff overlooking the Missouri River. In 1897 Amelia Earhart was born in the home, which belonged to her maternal grandfather, Alfred Gideon Otis (1827–1912), a former judge, president of the Atchison Savings Bank and a leading citizen in Atchison.  The Earharts attended nearby Trinity Episcopal Church where Amelia was baptized. The birthplace was added to the National Register of Historic Places in 1971 and is now a museum featuring memorabilia and artifacts about Amelia Earhart. The house served as a private residence until 1984 when a local citizen, Dr. Eugene J. Bribach, contributed $100,000 to the Ninety-Nines to acquire the property. Since 1984 the building has been maintained by the Ninety-Nines, an international group of female pilots of whom Amelia was the first elected president.

References

External links
Amelia Earhart Museum

Aerospace museums in Kansas
Birthplace
Houses on the National Register of Historic Places in Kansas
Museums established in 1984
Museums in Atchison County, Kansas
Women's museums in the United States
Houses in Atchison County, Kansas
Birthplaces of individual people
Birth
National Register of Historic Places in Atchison County, Kansas
1984 establishments in Kansas
Historic house museums in Kansas